In enzymology, a 2-oxoaldehyde dehydrogenase (NAD+) is an enzyme that catalyzes the chemical reaction

a 2-oxoaldehyde + NAD+ + H2O  a 2-oxo acid + NADH + H+

The 3 substrates of this enzyme are 2-oxoaldehyde, NAD+, and H2O, whereas its 3 products are 2-oxo acid, NADH, and H+.

This enzyme participates in pyruvate metabolism.

Nomenclature
This enzyme belongs to the family of oxidoreductases, specifically those acting on the aldehyde or oxo group of donor with NAD+ or NADP+ as acceptor.  The systematic name of this enzyme class is 2-oxoaldehyde:NAD+ 2-oxidoreductase.
Other names in common use include:
 alpha-ketoaldehyde dehydrogenase
 methylglyoxal dehydrogenase
 NAD+-linked alpha-ketoaldehyde dehydrogenase
 2-ketoaldehyde dehydrogenase
 NAD+-dependent alpha-ketoaldehyde dehydrogenase
 2-oxoaldehyde dehydrogenase (NAD+)

See also
 2-oxoaldehyde dehydrogenase (NADP+)

References

 
 
 

EC 1.2.1
NADH-dependent enzymes
Enzymes of unknown structure